Louvri is a village  and a community of the Voio municipality. Prior to the 2011 local government reform it was part of the municipality of Tsotyli, of which it was a municipal district. At the time of 2011 census, there were 51 individuals recorded as living in the village.

See also
List of settlements in the Kozani regional unit

References

Populated places in Kozani (regional unit)